Willowbank is a mansion in Queenston, Ontario, Canada.

History
Willowbank is a National Historic Site of Canada. It possesses in its exterior architecture and landscape the qualities of the Romantic fusion of Classical Revival architecture and the Picturesque style of landscaping.

Willowbank is named after magnificent willow trees that once graced its grounds; it is an elegant example of the rural estates of the wealthy settlers of early 19th century Upper Canada. The mansion was built between 1832 and 1834 for Alexander Hamilton, sheriff of the Niagara District. Alexander Hamilton was the third son of the Honourable Robert Hamilton, one of the founders of Upper Canada. Constructed in the Greek Revival style of architecture then at its height in North America for such grand houses, Willowbank is regarded as one of the finest remaining examples of such buildings on the continent. 

Designed by renowned architect, John Latshaw, and built of local Whirlpool Sandstone, the building is characterized by the rare features of eight hand-carved columns running its full two-story height, and by a front doorway considered to be a masterpiece of Greek design.

Another unique feature of the mansion is that it is set in a picturesque landscape which, like the exterior of the building, is designated and has remained essentially unchanged. The house sits prominently on its lawn hillside, overlooking the village of Queenston.  Viewing Willowbank from the base of the slope, one sees the thick foliage of untended trees which surround the large, tended lawn. The old carriageway winds up the slope, allowing only glimpses of the building until it comes into full view. Individual trees are interspersed in an unplanned fashion on the largely open lawn of the estate. There appear to be no prescribed garden features in the landscape; it would seem that the existing natural state of the property was used to create the setting for this imposing mansion, a constant reminder, like the nearby Brock's Monument, of our roots that lie deep in the rich soil of Upper Canada and in the place where the Canadian nation was born.

Willowbank is well protected from inappropriate alteration to the exterior of the building and its landscape, by legislation. It is designated under Part IV of the Ontario Heritage Act, it is a designated National Historic Site, and is further protected by a heritage easement granted to The Ontario Heritage Trust.

School of Restoration Arts
The School of Restoration Arts is dedicated to the teaching of all arts and skills related to restoration of built heritage, and uses historic buildings in need of restoration as the teaching venues. Willowbank will be the first 'workshop' of the building-cum-schools and will serve as the School's headquarters after restoration is complete.

The School intends to be the primary source in North America of knowledge and expertise devoted to the art and science of property conservation and restoration, and the respected provider of related programs of study. In time, the School will also become a heritage contractor. Willowbank is run by a group of heritage enthusiasts who have opened the School of Restoration Arts to teach the special skills needed to restore and preserve heritage buildings.

The objectives are to teach conservation and restoration skills, to teach the exploration of uses for heritage buildings to ensure their preservation, to teach the art of recording and salvaging elements of heritage buildings which are slated for demolition, to teach the exploration of heritage preservation programs and organizations, and to explore the establishment of a National Trust and a National Registry for heritage buildings, to market these skills in the community, to enhance employment opportunities and establish a skills base for others, to restore historic sites, to provide a model for similar schools, to promote public interest in restoration and conservation, to identify sources of sympathetic materials available for restoration and conservation needs.

Curriculum
The curriculum is focused on 'hands on' restoration, and conservation skills which will be taught through the experience of doing and creating actual restorations. This curriculum is rare in Canada.
The curriculum will be offered in several ways:
 Master classes, which will be "hands on" sessions, led by a Master craftsperson in which attendees complete a restoration project.
 Apprenticeship programs (which are part of the restoration of Willowbank)
 Lectures and Seminars

Tours and events
Willowbank is open to the public for tours through the summer months and September to May by appointment. Willowbank is also available to the community as a rental facility for conferences, meetings and formal gatherings. Cultural and heritage events allow Willowbank to showcase the broad spectrum of musical and creative talents that abound in the Niagara Region.

References

External links

Willowbank Estate
The School of Restoration Arts at Willowbank
Board of Directors for Willowbank Estate

Greek Revival houses in Canada
Buildings and structures in Niagara-on-the-Lake
Tourist attractions in the Regional Municipality of Niagara
Estate gardens in Canada
National Historic Sites in Ontario
Ontario Heritage Trust